Limbgaon is a village and railway station in Nanded taluka of Nanded district of Indian state of Maharashtra. It is located 14 km away from Nanded.

Demography
As per 2011 census, Limbgaon has total 951 families residing. Village has population of 4,560 of which 2,375 were males while 2,185 were females.
Average Sex Ratio of village is 920 which is lower than Maharashtra state average of 929.
Literacy rate of village was 76.5% compared to 82.95% of Maharashtra. Male literacy rate was 87.3% while female literacy rate was 65%.
Schedule Caste (SC) constitutes 24% of total population while Schedule Tribe was 0.2%.

Limbgaon Railway Station

Geography and Transport
Following table shows distance of Limbgaon from some of major cities.

References

Villages in Nanded district